Martin Andreas Unmack (c. 1753–1806) was a Norwegian civil servant and politician.  He served as the County Governor of Finnmarkens amt from 1800 until his death in 1806.

References

1753 births
1806 deaths
County governors of Norway